The banknotes of the Spanish peseta were emitted by the Bank of Spain in 1874–2001 until the introduction of the euro. From 1940 the banknotes were produced by the Royal Mint (Fábrica Nacional de Moneda y Timbre). In about the same year the inscription "El Banco de España" on both sides of the banknotes was temporarily changed to "Banco de España", as the definite article "el" was dropped. There is no significant legislation on the copyright of the Spanish peseta banknotes and their reproductions are permitted, except for advertising.

First Republic

Kingdom

Second Republic & Civil War

Spanish State & Democracy

References

Spanish peseta
Banking in Spain